Sam Evans is a fictional character from the Fox musical comedy-drama series Glee

Sam or Samantha Evans may also refer to:
 Sam Evans (Big Brother), Big Brother 14 contestant from Llanelli, born with 70-80% hearing loss
 Sam Evans (cricketer) (born 1997), English cricketer
 Sam Evans (footballer) (1904–?), Scottish footballer
 Samantha Evans (Planetshakers singer), Australian Christian worship leader and band member Planetshakers
 Samantha Evans (Days of Our Lives)

See also
 Samuel Evans (disambiguation)